Selvíria is a municipality located in the Brazilian state of Mato Grosso do Sul. Its population was 6,542 (2020) and its area is 3,259 km².

References

Municipalities in Mato Grosso do Sul